Joe Lawless (born 13 February 1962 in Dublin) is an Irish soccer player who was active during the 1980s and 1990s.

Lawless was a forward who represented Bray Wanderers, St Patrick's Athletic, Bohemian F.C. (2 spells), Derry City F.C., Waterford United and Drogheda United during his career in the League of Ireland. He also had a spell in the Irish League on loan to Omagh Town. He is one of a select few to have won both the FAI Junior Cup (with Cherry Orchard F.C.) and FAI Senior Cup.

He went to Glenmalure Park at U17 level and spent two seasons in the reserves under Eamon Dunphy. Frustrated at his lack of opportunities he moved back to Cherry Orchard.

He moved into the League of Ireland ranks in January 1986 when he moved from Orchard to Bray Wanderers. He made his League of Ireland debut for Bray on 19 January in a 2-1 win away to E.M.F.A. He made 5 appearances in the league that season as Bray clinched promotion to the Premier Division. After 2 seasons with Wanderers, he moved to Dalymount Park and Bohemians in 1987. He was on the move once again in 1989 when he moved to St. Pats where he picked a League winners medal that season.

He returned to Bohs for a 2nd spell in 1991 and helped to a FAI Cup victory that season. He scored 9 times in 31 league appearances that season for the "Gypsies" - his best ever scoring return. After a loan spell at Omagh at the beginning of the 1993/94 season, Joe headed to the Brandywell and signed for Derry City in October 1993. He picked up another winners medal that season by winning the League Cup. However, he was soon on the move once again when he signed for Waterford United and narrowly missed out on collecting the only domestic medal he hadn't got when his old club Bray beat Waterford in the final of the 1995 League of Ireland First Division Shield. He then moved to Drogheda United where he picked up a severe ligament injury which ended his league of Ireland career.

Honours
 League of Ireland: 1
 St Patrick's Athletic - 1989-90
 FAI Cup: 1
 Bohemians - 1992
 League of Ireland Cup: 1
 Derry City - 1993-94
 League of Ireland First Division: 1
 Bray Wanderers - 1985-86
 Irish Junior International Caps

Sources
 St Patrick's Athletic v Shamrock Rovers programme 27 August 1999

References

1962 births
Republic of Ireland association footballers
Association football forwards
League of Ireland players
Shamrock Rovers F.C. players
Bohemian F.C. players
Bray Wanderers F.C. players
St Patrick's Athletic F.C. players
Waterford F.C. players
Derry City F.C. players
Drogheda United F.C. players
Omagh Town F.C. players
NIFL Premiership players
Living people
Cherry Orchard F.C. players